The Canada A's are an independent professional baseball team representing Canada (and Cathedral City, California) that will be based in Palm Springs, California as a part of the new California Winter League. They play their games in a short-season schedule from January to February at Palm Springs Stadium along with the Palm Springs Chill, Coachella Valley Snowbirds and Palm Desert Coyotes.

They started as Team Canada in the rival Arizona Winter League, a short-season instructional winter league affiliated with the Golden Baseball League and played in the International Division. But they were reported to have left the AWL and joined the CWL as the Canada A's.

Year-By-Year Records

Arizona Winter League:

California Winter League:

External links
 California Winter League official website

Professional baseball teams in California
2009 establishments in California
Baseball teams established in 2009
Palm Springs, California